Adela Christian Bach Bottino (May 9, 1959 – February 26, 2019), known as Christian Bach, was an Argentine-born Mexican actress and producer of telenovelas produced by companies such as Televisa, TV Azteca and Telemundo.

Her most famous works in telenovelas with Televisa included Los ricos también lloran (1979), Soledad (1980), Bodas de odio (1983), De pura sangre (1985) and Encadenados (1988). With TV Azteca her most relevant works included Agua y aceite (2002), which she also produced along with her husband Humberto Zurita, and Vidas robadas (2010). With Telemundo her works included La Patrona (2013) and La Impostora (2014).

Biography
Bach was born in Buenos Aires to Roberto Bach Meizegeier and Adela Bottino Adamowa (better known as Adela Adamowa). After graduating with a degree in law Christian Bach moved to Mexico to become an actress. She started working in plays and in films, where her voice was often dubbed to conceal her Argentine accent. She obtained a small role in the worldwide hit telenovela Los ricos también lloran in 1979 and four years later a starring role in the successful Bodas de odio.

In 1986 she co-starred with Zurita in De pura sangre and in the same year they got married. Ten years later and after a string of successful productions with Televisa the Zurita-Bach couple decided to form their own production company, ZUBA Producciones, and to move to nascent network TV Azteca. Two years later they produced two telenovelas for the station, La chacala and Azul Tequila, a successful production that launched the career of Bárbara Mori and Mauricio Ochmann. In the 1980s she recorded an album as a solo singer, but the album lacked success and interest from the public.

In 1984 and 1989, Bach won the Best Actress award at the TVyNovelas. She also won the Best Actress TuMundo from Telemundo in 2013.

Bach died on February 26, 2019, due to respiratory failure. Her death was announced March 1 due to the actress' desire to keep personal matters private.

Filmography

Films

Television

TV shows
 Videoteatros: Véngan corriendo que les tengo un muerto (1993; producer)

See also
 Foreign-born artists in Mexico
 List of Argentines

Notes

References

External links
 Christian Bach profile at Alma-Latina.net 
 
 Profile at Zurita-Bach.com 
 

1959 births
2019 deaths
Actresses from Buenos Aires
Argentine film actresses 
Argentine telenovela actresses
Argentine emigrants to Mexico
Mexican film actresses 
Mexican telenovela actresses
Naturalized citizens of Mexico
Deaths from respiratory failure